KCWC-FM (88.1 FM) is a radio station broadcasting a Top 40/Contemporary Hits format. Licensed to Riverton, Wyoming, United States, the station is currently owned by Central Wyoming College.

History
The station went on the air as KCWC-FM on January 7, 1984. In January 2009, the name of the station, as well as its format, were changed. The station is now "Rustler Radio" and instead of a Jazz/Adult Alternative format, a Top 40/Contemporary Hits sound.
This station is non-commercial and frequently does PSA (Public Service Announcements), many of which are produced by its live on air DJ's and student employees.

References

External links
Rustler Radio Facebook

Radio Locator Information for K272BI

CWC-FM
CWC-FM
Radio stations established in 1984
Central Wyoming College
1984 establishments in Wyoming